

Belgium

China

Germany

France

United Kingdom

Italy

India

Israel

Japan

Pakistan

Russia

United States

References 

Nuclear reprocessing sites